The Madras Stock Exchange (MSE) was a stock exchange in Chennai, India. The now defunct MSE was the fourth stock exchange to be established in the country and the first in South India. It had a turnover (2001) of  3,090 crore ($440 million), but was a fraction (below 3.5 per cent) of the turnover generated by the Bombay Stock Exchange and National Stock Exchange of India. The turnover of the stock exchange was 19,907 Crore as of the financial year 2012.

History
The Madras Stock Exchange was founded in 1920 on Second Line Beach street in George Town. Chandulal Motilal Kothari, the driving force behind the founding of the exchange, became its first president. He established a planting and industrial conglomerate and later became the first Indian to represent the planting interests in the Madras Legislature. In 1951, his son, D. C. Kothari, became the first Indian Chairman of the United Planters' Association of Southern India.

In 1996, the MSE was fully computerised and online trading became operational, as the MSE was connected to 120 broking offices in and around Chennai through wide area networking. On 14 May 2015, SEBI permitted Madras stock exchange to exit.

Functions
The MSE had about 120 live members and 1,785 companies listed. The exchange followed the Rolling Settlement system, as per the January 2000 SEBI (Securities Exchange Board of India) guidelines and a proactive Grievance Cell is operational. By this system, investors could log in their complaints, for which a number was be given for further reference, through which investors could keep track of the action taken by the exchange as regards their complaint.

A subsidiary company - MSE Financial Services Ltd, had been established. A member of the Bombay Stock Exchange, MSE Financial Services did help to create greater broker and investor flexibility through multi-market access. The members were able to trade in both BSE and MSE. This was followed up with National Stock Exchange (NSE) membership.

Trading on the exchange took place from 10.00 am to 3.30 pm.

Merging
As per June 2012 notification from the Securities and Exchange Board of India (SEBI), whereby individual stock exchanges should maintain a minimum liquid net worth of  1,000 million and exchanges that do not comply with this requirement should close down their operations by June 2015, the Bangalore Stock Exchange (BgSE) decided to merge with the Madras Stock Exchange. The combined entity became the single largest regional exchange in the country with over 1,000 local companies listed exclusively on it. BgSE and MSE together had a liquid net worth of around  500 million while another  500 million will be raised by liquidating certain idle assets (situated in Bangalore and Chennai) of these exchanges.

See also 
 List of stock exchanges in the Commonwealth of Nations
 List of South Asian stock exchanges
 Economy of Chennai

References

Economy of Chennai
Former stock exchanges in India
1937 establishments in India
Financial services companies established in 1937